The Joint Organization of Unions – Hong Kong is a trade union centre in Hong Kong. It is affiliated with the International Trade Union Confederation.

References

National trade union centres of Hong Kong
International Trade Union Confederation